Nasal clicks are click consonants pronounced with nasal airflow. All click types (alveolar , dental , lateral , palatal , retroflex , and labial ) have nasal variants, and these are attested in four or five phonations: voiced, voiceless, aspirated, murmured (breathy voiced), and—in the analysis of Miller (2011)—glottalized.

Modally voiced nasal clicks are ubiquitous: They are found in every language which has clicks as part of its regular sound inventory. This includes Damin, which has only nasal clicks, and Dahalo, which has only plain and glottalized nasal clicks. That is, you pronounce a uvular  sound (like English ng) with the back of your tongue, and make the click sound in the middle of it using the front of your tongue.

Aspirated nasal clicks, often described as voiceless nasal with delayed aspiration, are widespread in southern Africa, being found in all languages of the Khoe, Tuu, and Kx'a language families, though they are unattested elsewhere. Initially and in citation form, words with these consonants are pronounced with voiceless nasal airflow throughout the production of the click and in some languages for an extended time afterward; this period of up to 150 ms (the voice onset time) may include weak breathy-voiced aspiration at the end. However, when embedded in a phrase after a vowel they tend to be partially voiced; the preceding vowel will also be nasalized or the click prenasalized, for a realization of  vs . They have a tone-depressor effect, so that a level tone on the following vowel will be realized as rising. 

The description above is typical, characteristic of languages such as Khoekhoe and Gǀui. However, aspirated nasal clicks have a more extreme pronunciation in Taa, where they need to maintain a distinction from both the plain voiceless and breathy-voiced nasal clicks. In this language they are not voiced after vowel sounds except in rapid speech, and in addition do not have nasal airflow; Trail reports that they instead have active ingressive pulmonic airflow (that is, air is breathed in the nose rather than being vented out).

Breathy-voiced (murmured) nasal clicks are less common. They are known from !Kung languages such as Juǀʼhoansi, from Taa, and from the Bantu languages Xhosa and Zulu. They are pronounced like modally voiced nasal clicks, but in addition are followed by a period of murmured phonation, and like other breathy-voiced consonants, may have a depressor effect on tone (in Zulu and Xhosa, for example). In IPA, they could be either  or 

Voiceless nasal clicks distinct from voiceless aspirated clicks are only attested from one language, Taa, which changes the voicing of the initial consonant to distinguish singular and plural nouns. In this language, both voiced and voiceless nasal clicks (but not the aspirated and breathy-voiced nasal clicks) nasalize the following vowel; they are largely distinguished by voiceless vs. murmured nasalization leading up to the click release, and the voicelessness occurs even after vowels.

Glottalized nasal clicks are extremely common, but are covered in another article: Glottalized clicks.

There are also preglottalized nasal clicks. These are pronounced like modally voiced nasal clicks, but the click release is preceded by a short period of nasalization that has a glottal-stop onset. They are considered unitary consonants, and not sequences of glottal stop plus nasal click. They are only reported from a few languages: Taa, Ekoka !Kung, and ǂHoan. (Taa also has preglottalized non-click nasals, though Ekoka apparently does not.)

References

See also
Glottalized click
Pulmonic-contour click
Ejective-contour click

Click consonants